Charlie's Farm is a 2014 Australian slasher film written and directed by Chris Sun about the violent history of Charlie’s Farm brutally brought to life when four horror seeking youths stumble across a legend that refuses to die. The film stars Tara Reid, Nathan Jones, Allira Jaques, Bill Moseley, Kane Hodder, Dean Kirkright and Sam Coward.

Plot
Friends Jason (Dean Kirkright) and Mick (Sam Coward) nicknamed “Donkey”, plot a road trip to "Charlie's Farm" which is believed to be haunted. The two persuade Jason's girlfriend Natasha (Tara Reid), to call her best friend Melanie (Allira Jaques) to come with them, without informing them about the history of the site. After hours of driving, the group stop at a pub for food and directions to the farm. A pub patron, old Blue (Robert J Mussett), warns them not to continue resulting in a fight between Mick and another patron (Brad Bromfield), who angrily changes his mind after the fight and gives them directions. At a campfire, Melanie and Natasha confront the two and Mick eventually tells them the story of Charlie's Farm:

In the 1980s, John Wilson (Bill Moseley) and his wife Meredith (Trudi Ross) are farmers, murderers and cannibals. The local townspeople, led by Blue, confront the couple over a slew of missing backpackers, which included Amber, whom the two had just murdered and eaten. After an argument, Blue shoots John dead while Meredith escapes with their mentally handicapped son Charlie. Meredith manages to hide Charlie before being caught, interrogated and beaten to death by the locals while Charlie watches. Charlie is never seen again, and is presumed dead.

The next day, desperate to find the farm, Jason calls their boxer friend Tony Stewart (Kane Hodder) for directions. Tony warns them to be careful at the Farm. Arriving at the gate to the property, they decide to walk to the farmhouse. Upon exploring the house, Melanie finds an old teddy bear of Charlie's and decides to keep it. In the middle of the night when the group are sleeping, Melanie awakens to see an enormous, hulking figure looming over them; the full-grown Charlie (Nathan Jones).

Melanie dismisses it as a dream. Morning comes and two backpackers, Gordon (David Beamish) and Alyssa (Genna Chanelle Hayes), arrive at the farm for the same reason as the group. Later on the group decides to split up and explore the property. Gordon and Alyssa come upon a barn which appears to be Charlie's base of operations. Charlie ambushes them and kills Gordon with an axe to the chest and Alyssa by crushing her head beneath a tractor wheel. Meanwhile, Mick and Melanie discover a lake and go skinny dipping.

They are amazed at Charlie who is watching them from the dam. Mick goes to confront Charlie, naked, who cuts off Mick's genital and shoves it down his throat, killing him. Melanie runs and is chased through the woods but is killed when Charlie rips out her lower jaw. Natasha and Jason find another barn. Jason insists they go inside but Natasha refuses and waits. Tony, fearing for the group, goes to the Farm to check on them. Meanwhile, Jason, who was taking a long time inside, alarms Natasha who follows him in. Jason warns Natasha to be quiet as he finds Charlie roaming inside the barn.

Tony arrives and faces Charlie head-on in hand-to-hand combat. Jason tries to assist but Tony is killed when Charlie tears out the skin on his neck. Jason is then also killed when Charlie slits his throat in front of Natasha. Natasha flees but is knocked unconscious and captured by Charlie. She then wakes up in an underground chamber, breaks free and escapes, discovering many corpses of Charlie's previous victims.  Old Blue, the elderly patron from the pub, appears and assists Natasha in escaping. Charlie, however, catches up to them and kills Old Blue with an axe to the back. Natasha takes Old Blue's rifle and shoots Charlie in the chest, maybe kill him. She gets to Old blue's truck, but Charlie surprises her by impaling her with a rifle in her stomach, pulling out her guts, which he tosses away after killing her. Charlie then picks up her dead body and goes back to his land.

Cast 
 Tara Reid as Natasha
 Dean Kirkright as Jason
 Allira Jaques as Melanie
 Sam Coward as Mick "Donkey"
 Kane Hodder as Tony Stewart
 Nathan Jones as Charlie Wilson
 Genna Chanelle Hayes as Alyssa
 Dave Beamish as Gordon
 Bill Moseley as John Wilson
 Trudi Ross as Meredith Wilson
 Madeleine Kennedy as Amber
 Jeff Watson as Blue
 Brad Bromfield as Pub Patron
 Cameron Caulfield as Young  Charlie Wilson
 Lindsay Edgecomb as Sally
 Justin Gerardin as Peter

Release
Charlie's Farm premiered in Australian theatres on 4 December 2014, and was released in the United States on 1 March 2015. The Blu-ray and DVD of the film was released on 17 June 2015 in Australia and UK. It was also released on 25 July 2015 in Germany in mediabook format by Meteor Film.

Reception

Chris Coffel from Bloody Disgusting gave the film a mostly positive review, commending the film's kills, and entertainment value, while noting the film's weak story, and bad acting. Dan Caps from HorrorNews.net rated the film a score of two out of four, criticizing the film's lack of character development, script, performances, and third act, calling the film "unsatisfying". Caps however, commended the film's cinematography, sound effects, and special effects.

References

External links 
 
 Charlie's Farm Official Website
 Slaughter FX Studio
 

2014 films
2014 horror films
2010s slasher films
Australian horror films
Australian slasher films
Backwoods slasher films
Films set on farms
Films set in Queensland
Films shot in Queensland
2010s English-language films